Awadhesh Prasad Kushwaha is an Indian politician and was a leader of Janata Dal (United) . He served as minister in Nitish Kumar ministry as Excise Minister until October 2015. He was forced to resign as minister when a sting video surfaced on showing him accepting bribe from a businessman.

References

Janata Dal (United) politicians
Corruption in Bihar
Living people
Year of birth missing (living people)